The Yinxiang Group (银翔) is an industrial company based in Chongqing, China,  specializing in real estate and research, development, manufacturing and sales of motorcycles, passenger vehicles, gasoline engines and general-purpose engines and equipment.

Brands

Yinxiang Motorcycle
The Yinxiang Motorcycle was founded in 1997. It is the motorcycle brand of Yinxiang Group.

Huansu (discontinued)
BAIC Yinxiang's sub-brand Huansu, also spelled Hyosow,  is a joint venture brand between the BAIC Group and Yinxiang Group that sells passenger cars.
 Huansu C60
 Huansu H2
 Huansu H3
 Huansu H6
 Huansu S2
 Huansu S3
 Huansu S5
 Huansu S6
 Huansu S7

Bisu (discontinued)
With the experience of the BAIC Yinxiang joint venture, the Bisu brand was created. Bisu is a brand that sells crossovers and MPVs. When the T3 and T5 were discontinued in 2020, the brand was also discontinued.
 Bisu M3 (2016-2019)
 Bisu T3 (2016-2020)
 Bisu T5 (2016-2020)

Weiwang
Weiwang is a brand under the Beiqi (BAIC) Yinxiang Automobile joint venture that focuses on compact MPVs, CUVs, and minivans.
 Weiwang 205
 Weiwang 306
 Weiwang 307
 Weiwang 407 EV
 Weiwang M20
 Weiwang M30
 Weiwang M35
 Weiwang M50F
 Weiwang M60
 Weiwang S50

Ruixiang

The BAIC Ruixiang is another brand launched after the original BAIC Yinxiang went bankrupt in April 2021 when a Chongqing court rules over the bankruptcy and re-organization proceedings. A total of 2 billion yuan was later invested in the company as of 2021, and it was renamed to BAIC Ruixiang Automobile. 300 million yuan comes from BAIC Group through a newly established subsidiary of Chongqing Changhe Automobile, 487 million came from the original Yinxiang Group and 1.2 billion came from an investment fund owned by the Chongqing municipal government. The Ruixiang brand was launched with the introduction of the Ruixiang X5 and X3, with three rebadged vehicles later joined the lineup in 2022 under the Boteng series.

 Ruixiang C5 EV
 Ruixiang X3
 Ruixiang X5 (originally the VGV TX7)
 Ruixiang Boteng V1
 Ruixiang Boteng V2
 Ruixiang Boteng M3
 Ruixiang Hoen O2 (originally the Qingchengshidai VC, 轻橙时代 VC)

References

External links 
Official website of Yinxiang Group

Motorcycle manufacturers of China
Manufacturing companies based in Chongqing
Manufacturing companies established in 2001
Chinese brands